Artsakhbank is an Armenian bank with headquarters in Yerevan. As of November 20, 2017, the Bank has 7 branches in Yerevan and 11 branches in the unrecognized Republic of Artsakh (de jure part of Azerbaijan).

History
The bank was established on February 12, 1996. On November 6, 1996 Artsakhbank, Closed joint-stock company was transformed into Artsakhbank, Open Joint-Stock Company, according to the resolution of the Bank’s Shareholders General Meeting. On June 24, 2001 Artsakhbank, OJSC, was reorganized back into Artsakhbank, Closed joint-stock company (CJSC).

The bank is a shareholder of Armenian Card (ArCa)  and a full member of ArCa the Armenian national payment system, a member of Europay/MasterCard international payment system, and a member of SWIFT system.

Artsakhbank is a member of international money transfer systems, such as MoneyGram, Migom, Leader, Anelik. The Bank has correspondent relations with 25 banks, both local and foreign.

Operations

The Bank serves 43,787 customers, of which 41,427 are individuals.

The Bank has 482 employees, as of January 1, 2011.

As of the same period, the Bank’s total equity came to AMD 8 960,358mln (USD 24.7mln), total assets - AMD 52 618,110 mln(USD 145.2mln) and liabilities - AMD 43 657,752 mln (USD 120.5mln).

See also

Armenian dram
Artsakh dram
List of banks in Armenia
Economy of Armenia
Economy of the Republic of Artsakh

External links 

Banks of Armenia
Banks established in 1996